The 2014 season was York Region Shooters's 17th season in the Canadian Soccer League. It began on May 25, 2014 and concluded on October 26 2014. The club ended the Canadian Soccer League campaign as champions without a single defeat – a record of 13 wins and 5 draws. Their perfect season also included the First Division title with York Region finishing eleven points ahead of Toronto Croatia. In the preliminary round of the postseason the club defeated Brampton City United. In the second round they defeated Astros Vasas FC, and Toronto Croatia in the CSL Championship final. For the second consecutive season striker Richard West finished as the club's top goalscorer with nine goals.

Summary 
The Canadian Soccer League's strained relationship with the Canadian Soccer Association continued before the launch of the 2014 season with the CSA expelling the CSL from its membership over alleged violations of rules and regulations. After failing to specify which rule violations were made the CSL in response filed litigation against the CSA. As a result the league began operating as a private league under the auspicious of the Soccer Federation of Canada.

Before the launch of the season York Region formed an affiliation deal with Winstars Academy Group. The agreement officially aligned the academy to the York Region Shooters, and launched a team in the Second Division as the Winstars Shooters. Changes were made to the managerial team with former player Darryl Gomez given the mantle of head coach, with Tony De Thomasis serving as his assistant coach. Gomez constructed his roster with imports with Caribbean and European experience along with several Canadian Interuniversity Sport players.

The season marked a historic milestone in the organization's history as they managed to produce a perfect season, and a team record of only 15 goals conceded. York Region became the second team in the league's history to achieve a perfect season including the CSL Championship. In the Second Division their reserve team finished third in the standings. At the conclusion of the season accolades were given to Darryl Gomez as the Coach of the Year.

Club

Management

First Division roster
As of March 14, 2014.

Transfers

In

Out

Competitions summary

Regular season

First division

Results summary

Results by round

Matches

Postseason

Statistics

Goals 
Correct as of October 6, 2014

References 

York Region Shooters
York Region Shooters
2014